Technical High School (Tech) was a public high school that was located at 3215 Cuming Street in Omaha, Nebraska, United States. Opened in 1923, the school was said to be the largest high school west of Chicago. It was the largest in the Omaha area before it was closed in 1984. Today the building serves as the headquarters of Omaha Public Schools.

About
The five-winged building and large athletic field occupied three city blocks between Burt and Cuming Streets, from 30th to 33rd Streets in North Omaha. The new school opened on October 15, 1923, with nearly 2,400 pupils. By 1940 enrollment had reached 3,684.

As a high school focused on technical education, Tech had many amenities designed to teach students in specific areas. It had two large gymnasiums and a swimming pool, which was for many years the only pool in any Omaha public school. The roof of the building featured a deck with a canopy that housed an exercise area.

An entire floor was dedicated to classrooms for home economics. There were extensive wood and metal shops, as well as scientific laboratories and a greenhouse. The building had 124 rooms. As early as 1947, there were 2,700 students and 100 teachers. Developed with high academic standards, the school was a forerunner in vocational high schools by offering students who largely chose not to go to college the opportunity to learn a trade or profession.

There was a high school radio station at Tech in the 1920s, whose call letters were KFOX.

The auditorium at the school was built to accommodate 2600 people (legal seating capacity was listed at 2120). John Philip Sousa and his marching band appeared in October 1928. Cornelia Otis Skinner made her first high school appearance at Tech in January 1930. In November 1926 the Metropolitan Opera Company of New York gave a performance. Helen Hayes and Douglas Fairbanks Jr. also gave performances at Tech.

In the 1960s the Black Association for Nationalism Through Unity was unsuccessful in starting a chapter at Tech, although one of its leaders became a student government official.

Present
After the school closed in 1984, the building was completely renovated for use as the Omaha Public Schools' central office. It also serves as a home for the Career Center and Adult Education programs, serving over 700 students daily.

Opera Omaha performed at Tech before they had facilities at the Orpheum Theater.

Notable graduates 
 John Beasley, actor and acting coach; co-starred in the Academy Award-winning film The Apostle 
 Ron Boone, professional basketball player
 Bob Boozer, college and professional basketball player and Olympic gold medalist in 1960
 Sen. Ernie Chambers, 11th District, Nebraska State Legislature in 1955
 Captain Alfonza W. Davis, Tuskegee Airman
 James Dworak, former Omaha mayor
 Bob Gibson, Baseball Hall of Famer for the St. Louis Cardinals and Creighton University stand-out
 Mel Harder, professional baseball player
 Fred Hare, former college and professional basketball player
 Louis Hartz, former political scientist and influential proponent of the idea of American exceptionalism
 Jim Houston, national rodeo champion
 Roman Hruska, former US Senator
 Johnny Rodgers, former college football superstar, Heisman Trophy winner, and voted the University of Nebraska's "Player of the Century"
 Johnny Rosenblatt, former Omaha mayor
 Jack Urban, former MLB player (Kansas City Athletics, St. Louis Cardinals)
 Brigadier General Kenneth Walker, US Army Air Corps, posthumous recipient of the Medal of Honor in World War II, and pioneer in military aviation
 Les Webster, college and professional football player for the Cincinnati Bengals
 Lucille Wilson, three-time member of US women's track team in the Olympics
 Phil Wise, college and professional football player

See also
 Education in North Omaha, Nebraska

References

External links
 Historic picture of Technical High School
 Historic postcard of Tech H.S.

Related publications
 Brookins, J. (1925) "Drama in a Technical High School," Peabody Journal of Education. 2(4) pp. 190–196

Defunct schools in Omaha, Nebraska
History of North Omaha, Nebraska
Schools in North Omaha, Nebraska
Educational institutions established in 1921
1921 establishments in Nebraska
1984 disestablishments in Nebraska
Educational institutions disestablished in 1984